is a railway station on the Osaka Metro Yotsubashi Line and the Nankō Port Town Line (New Tram) in Suminoe-ku, Osaka, Japan.

Lines
Suminoekoen Station is served by the Yotsubashi Line (station number Y21) and Nankō Port Town Line (station number P18), and is the terminus of the both lines.

Station layout

Yotsubashi Line
The station has one island platform serving two tracks located on the second basement level.

Nankō Port Town Line
The station has one island platform serving two tracks on the second floor level.

History
Suminoekoen Station opened on 9 November 1972.

Surrounding area
Suminoe Park
Osaka Gokoku Shrine
Suminoe Ward Office
Suminoe Library
Osker Dream building
Osaka City Bus Terminal
Mag's Futsal Stadium
Boat Race Suminoe

References

External links

 Suminoekoen Station – Yotsubashi Line information 
 Suminoekoen Station – Port Town Line information 
 Suminoekoen Station – Yotsubashi Line information 
 Suminoekoen Station – Port Town Line information 

Railway stations in Osaka Prefecture
Railway stations in Japan opened in 1972
Osaka Metro stations
Railway stations in Japan opened in 1981